Latta House may refer to:

in the United States (by state then city)
 May-Latta House, Prestonsburg, Kentucky, listed on the National Register of Historic Places (NRHP) in Floyd County
 E. D. Latta Nurses' Residence, Asheville, North Carolina, listed on the NRHP in Buncombe County
 Latta House (Huntersville, North Carolina), listed on the NRHP in Mecklenburg County
 Rev. M.L. Latta House, Raleigh, North Carolina, NRHP-listed
 Latta House (Dyersburg, Tennessee), NRHP-listed